Bulan may refer to:

Places
 Bulan, Kentucky, US
 Bulan, Kermanshah, Iran
 Bulan, Sorsogon, Philippines
 Bulan, Tehran, Iran
 Bulan, Hautes-Pyrénées, France
 Bulan Island, in the Sijori Growth Triangle, Riau Islands Province, Indonesia
 Bulan Island, in the Sulu Archipelago, Philippines

Other uses
 Bulan (Khazar), Khazar ruler of the eighth or ninth century CE, who converted to Judaism
 Bulan, a figure in the mythology of the Bicolano people of the Philippines

See also
 "Buwan", a 2018 song by Juan Karlos Labajo
 Mayari, or Buwan, a moon goddess in Tagalog mythology